The following is a list of characters that first appeared on the Channel 4 soap opera Hollyoaks in 1998, by first appearance.

Tessie Thompson

Tessie Thompson is a fictional character from the British Channel 4 soap opera Hollyoaks, played by Sian Gibson (originally credited under her maiden name of Foulkes). She debuted on-screen during 1998, she was involved in storylines such as pretending to be pregnant, extortion and hiding Tony Hutchinson's son from him for 8 years. The Sun announced her return on 17 October 2007.

Tessie and Tony Hutchinson (Nick Pickard) begin dating, she pretends to be pregnant before she tries to scam him and take his money. She gets found out and leaves Tony who is humiliated. Several years after her last appearance, Tessie returned to Tony's thirtieth birthday party. She tells him she has a surprise to show him, before introducing him to his long-lost son, Harry. When she supposedly lied about her pregnancy, she was really pregnant and had chosen to lie about it. Tony tried to spend time with Harry, but ultimately chose girlfriend Jacqui Malota (Claire Cooper) over a relationship with Harry. A few months later, Jacqui changed her mind and let Tony see his son.

In 2018, following Harry's estrangement from his family, Harry decided to stay with his mother. Tessie wouldn't speak to Tony for not siding with Harry. Upon Harry returns to the village a year later, Tony asked him how his mother is, he said that she is doing fine.

Jasmine Bates

Jasmine Bates is a fictional character from the British Channel 4 soap opera Hollyoaks, played by Elly Fairman. She first appeared in 1998 before leaving in 1999. She had a brief relationship with the new lifeguard at the college pool, Adam Morgan. She was also part of a "controversial lesbian affair" in which she and flatmate Ruth Osborne (Terri Dwyer) kissed before spending the night together. The Daily Record listed them among "The soap stars who boosted the ratings with their shocking clinches". The Daily Record also described the storyline saying "Wait until the TV watchdog people see this week's Hollyoaks – lesbian kissing scenes at tea-time. Phil Redmond brought you your first lesbian kiss in Brookside a good few years ago now and there was uproar. Now he's at it again in his teen-soap as a good old heart-to-heart between Jasmine and Ruth over a bottle of wine leads to something more. The next morning, Ruth is not a happy girl at all, as she regrets her night of passion with her flatmate. Oh dear. Sparks will fly."

Rory Finnigan

Rory "Finn" Finnigan is a fictional character from the British Channel 4 soap opera Hollyoaks, played by James Redmond. He first appeared in 1998 before leaving in 2002, after playing the character for 4 years. He left to return to his previous life before his time in Hollyoaks village. Rory has been described as a "cheeky chancer" and a "heart-throb". In 2009 the Daily Star reported current Hollyoaks producer Lucy Allan was planning to lure Redmond back into his role.

Paul Millington

Paul Millington is a fictional character from the British Channel 4 soap opera Hollyoaks, played by Zander Ward. He first appeared in 1998 before leaving in 2000. Paul was a friend of Sol Patrick (Paul Danan) and developed feelings for Sol's sister Gina (Dannielle Brent). However, Gina rejected him as she was a lesbian. Paul was artistic and painted the wall behind Finn's Bus, but used the wrong paint as he could not read the label. Gina discovered that Paul was unable to read or write, and covered for him on several occasions. Paul and Sol later went into business together as car washers. However, the business failed when Darren Osborne (Ashley Taylor Dawson) got involved, and they all fell out after he fired Sol. Gina convinced Paul to attend literacy classes, and he agreed on the condition that she pretended to be illiterate so that she could join him. However, she left part way through the class to show Paul that he did not need her with him. Paul later enrolled in an art course. When tearaway teen Zara Morgan (Kelly Greenwood) dared her friend, Hannah, to flirt with Paul, he took a liking to the pair and became friends with Zara. After Zara set fire to Hollyoaks High School, Paul accompanied her to her counselling sessions. Zara ended up falling for Paul and tried to kiss him, but he rejected her. Zara wrote in her diary that she had slept with Paul, which her father discovered, shoving Paul onto a table with glasses. Paul temporarily lost feeling in his hand but decided against pressing charges, and ended up leaving the village.

Emily Taylor

Emily Taylor is a fictional character from the British Channel 4 soap opera Hollyoaks, played by Lorna Pegler. She first appeared in 1998 before leaving in 2001. She was the girlfriend of Gina Patrick (Dannielle Brent). Emily and Gina shared an interest in animal welfare, and they began a relationship together. Emily ended up cheating on Gina so their relationship ended. Emily shared a kiss with Nikki Sullivan (Wendy Glenn), but was furious when Nikki told her she only kissed Emily to see how kissing a woman would feel. Emily and Gina reconciled, and Emily left with Gina when Gina went to do charity work in China.

References

External links

, Hollyoaks
1998